The Enchanted  is a 1950 English adaptation by Maurice Valency of the play  Intermezzo  written in 1933 by French dramatist Jean Giraudoux.

Original productions
Intermezzo was translated into English as The Enchanted by Maurice Valency, in Jean Giraudoux, Four Plays, vol. 1 (1958), and by Roger Gellert, in Jean Giraudoux, Plays, vol. 2 (1967).

 Intermezzo  was first performed on 27 February 1933 in Paris at the Comedie des Champs-Elysees in a production by Louis Jouvet.

Maurice Valency's adaptation The Enchanted opened at New York's Lyceum Theatre on 18 January 1950 in a production staged by George S. Kaufman, starring Leueen MacGrath, Malcolm Keen, and John Baragrey.

References

External links
 
 
 
 

Plays by Jean Giraudoux
1933 plays
Broadway plays
1950 plays
English plays
Plays based on other plays